Panic 911  (also stylized as PANIC 9-1-1) is an American documentary television series that airs on A&E and debuted on November 29, 2012. A second season began airing on August 8, 2013.

PANIC 9-1-1 returned for a third season on June 25, 2022. The one-hour docudrama aired Saturdays at 10:00 p.m. ET (9:00 p.m. CT).

Premise 
The docudrama series follows and reenacts the events of real 9-1-1 calls, including actual audio. The urgent life-and-death situations unfold between emergency dispatchers and frantic callers. Within each episode, the 9-1-1 call narrates what is happening, while interviews with those involved are also included with their first-hand details.

Each episode opens with the following:

According to A&E: PANIC 9-1-1 is an innovative series featuring dramatic 9-1-1 calls as they play out in “real time”. Three calls per episode deliver nail-biting tension, bone-chilling dread, courage and heroism while capturing raw and inspiring tales of humanity. First-person interviews, graphics and recreations further help bring the calls to life.

Episodes

Season 1 (2012)

Season 2 (2013)

Season 3 (2022) 
PANIC 9-1-1 returned for a third season in June 2022, with thirteen episodes airing on A&E, between June 6 and September 3.

References 

2010s American documentary television series
2012 American television series debuts
2013 American television series endings
English-language television shows
A&E (TV network) original programming